Cabell d'àngel  ( cabello de ángel; literally "angel's hair") is a transparent threaded jam made from Siam pumpkin (Cucurbita ficifolia) pulp and white sugar. It originated in Mallorca but its use has spread to the rest of Spain and some countries in the Americas.

Uses
Cabello de ángel can be used simply as a pumpkin jam spread on slices of bread, but it is mainly used to stuff pastries, as ensaïmades, pastissets and coques.

Preparation
The pumpkin is boiled in water until it falls apart into fibres. This pulp is cooked in sugar syrup with slow and frequent stirring. In Mallorca, it is baked instead of being boiled, intensifying the flavour. The jam can be seasoned with cinnamon or citrus zest. It is best when prepared in the spring, once the pumpkins have fully matured.

See also
 Cucurbita ficifolia
 List of spreads

References

Spanish_cuisine
Catalan cuisine
Valencian cuisine
Balearic cuisine
Spreads (food)
Squash and pumpkin dishes